Lurdes Marcelina Manuel Monteiro (born 11 July 1984) is an Angolan handball player. She plays for the club Primeiro de Agosto and on the Angolan national team. She represented Angola at the 2013 World Women's Handball Championship in Serbia and at the 2016 Summer Olympics.

References

External links
 

Angolan female handball players
Olympic handball players of Angola
Handball players at the 2016 Summer Olympics
1984 births
Living people
African Games gold medalists for Angola
African Games medalists in handball
Competitors at the 2015 African Games